Peter Meineck (born 1967) is Professor of Classics in the Modern World at New York University. He is also the founder and humanities program director of Aquila Theatre and has held appointments at Princeton University and University of South Carolina.

Early life and education
Peter Meineck was born in Melton Mowbray, England and grew up in New Malden in South West London. His mother, Margaret was a primary school teacher and his father David, a builder. He has two older siblings. He attended Glastonbury Junior School in Morden and Beverley Boys School in New Malden and left at age 16 to pursue a military career culminating in service with the Royal Marines Reserve while at University. He earned a BA (Hons) in Ancient World Studies at University College London and a PhD in Classics at the University of Nottingham.

Career 
He is Professor of Classics in the Modern World at New York University, Honorary Professor in Humanities at the University of Nottingham and an affiliated faculty member in Drama at NYU's Tisch School of the Arts. He specializes in Greek drama, performance and literature, cognitive theory applied to antiquity and the performance of trauma in antiquity. He has also held teaching posts at Princeton University, NYU's Tisch School of the Arts, and USC.

Theatre work 
He is the director of Aquila Theatre's public programming and has implemented arts and humanities programs aimed at veteran and civilian dialogues, At-Risk students in Harlem and The Bronx, and underserved communities via public libraries. His public programs received a Chairman's Special Award from the National Endowment for the Humanities and have been presented at the Obama and Bush White Houses, the U.S. Supreme Court, U.S. Congress, Metropolitan Museum of Art, Federal Hall National Memorial and throughout the United States. Fellowships include the Harvard Center for Hellenic Studies, Princeton University, the University of California San Diego, the Onassis Foundation, the Loeb Classical Library Foundation and a Phi Beta Kappa visiting scholar. 

Peter Meineck worked extensively in London theatre and founded Aquila Theatre in 1991. His stated aim with Aquila is to bring the greatest works to the greatest number and he has developed a sixty-seventy city American tour that brings classical drama to communities of all sizes across the USA.  He also developed regular seasons Off-Broadway in New York City and has produced classical drama at venues such as Carnegie Hall, Lincoln Center, the Ancient Stadium at Delphi, and the Brooklyn Academy of Music. He has directed and/or produced over fifty stage productions including Agamemnon (1991 and 2004 with Olympia Dukakis), Ajax (1992), Wasps (1994), Coriolanus (1995), The Iliad Book One (1999 and 2005), Comedy of Errors (1999, 2003, and 2007), The Invisible Man (2005), Much Ado About Nothing (2001 and 2006), Romeo and Juliet (2007), Prometheus Bound (2007), Catch-22 (2008), An Enemy of the People (2009), Murder on the Nile (2016).

Peter Meineck has translated and published several Greek dramas including Aeschylus' Oresteia, Sophocles' Philoctetes, Oedipus at Colonus, Oedipus Tyrannus (with Paul Woodruff), and Ajax, Euripides' Trojan Women, and Herakles and Aristophanes' Clouds, Wasps, Birds and Frogs. He has also adapted the opera libretto for Cherubini’s Medee performed at Carnegie Hall and wrote and directed a new stage adaptation of Joseph Heller's Catch-22. He was a consultant on the film I Am Legend and several other movie projects. Other stage adaptations or co-adaptations include Frankenstein, The Odyssey, The Man Who Would Be King, A Female Philoctetes, and The Canterbury Tales.

Personal life 
Peter Meineck married ballerina Desiree Sanchez in 2004. He currently serves as volunteer firefighter (ex-Asst. Chief) in New York and is also an Emergency Medical Technician.

Awards
1999: USC Honors College Mortar Board Teaching Award
2000: Louis Galantiere Award for Oresteia, American Translators Association
2009: New York University Arts and Science Golden Dozen Teaching Award
2010: National Endowment for the Humanities Chairman's Special Award.
2011: American Philological Association Award for Outreach.

Published works (books) 

Oresteia, with Helene P Foley (Hackett Publishing Company, 1998)
Aristophanes 1 : The Clouds, Wasps, Birds (Hackett, 1998)
Oedipus Tyrannus with Paul Woodruff (Hackett, 2000)
Clouds (Hackett, 2000)
The trials of Socrates : six classic texts, with C D C Reeve and James Doyle (Hackett, 2002)
Theban Plays with Paul Woodruff (Hackett, 2003)
Four Tragedies: Electra, Philoctetes, Ajax, The Women of Trachis with Paul Woodruff (Hackett, 2007)
 The Electra Plays: with Paul Woodruff and Cecelia Eaton Luschnig(Hackett, 2009)
 Combat Trauma and The Ancient Greeks, with David Konstan, Palgrave MacMillan, 2014. 
 Philoctetes, Hackett Publishing Company, 2014.
 Theatrocracy: Greek Drama, Cognition and the Imperative for Theatre'', Routledge, 2017.
 "The Routledge Handbook of Classics and Cognitive Theory", Routledge, 2019.
 "Aristophanes' Frogs", Hackett Publishing Company, 2021.

Selected chapters and journal articles 

"Forsaking the Fidelity Discourse". in Liapis, V. and Sidiropoulou, A. eds., Adapting Greek Tragedy: Contemporary Contexts for Ancient Texts. Cambridge University Press 2020.
"Masks". In The Routledge Companion to Health Humanities (pp. 292-295). Routledge, 2020.
"The Warrior Chorus program. THE ROUTLEDGE COMPANION TO HEALTH HUMANITIES, p.54, 2020, 
"Post-conflict resolution and the health humanities: The Warrior Chorus program". In The Routledge Companion to Health Humanities (pp. 54-59). Routledge, 2020, 
"Classics". In The Routledge Companion to Health Humanities (pp. 267-270). Routledge, 2020, 
"The Remains of Ancient Action: Understanding affect and empathy in Greek drama." In The Routledge Companion to Theatre, Performance, and Cognitive Science, pp. 66-74. Routledge, 2018.
“The Greek Mask as Material Engagement Mind Tool” in A History of Distributed Cognition Vol. 1., Miranda Anderson and Douglas Cairns (eds.), Edinburgh
University Press 2017
“Thebes as High Collateral Damage Target: Moral Accountability for Killing in Seven Against Thebes” in Aeschylus and War: Comparative Perspectives on Seven Against Thebes, Isabelle Torrance (Ed.), Routledge, 2017.
“Cognitive Theory and Aeschylus: Translating Beyond the Lexicon” in The Reception of Aeschylus’ Plays Through Shifting Models and Frontiers, Stratos E.
Constantinidis (ed.), Brill 2016.
"Greek drama in North America" in The Encyclopedia on the Reception of Ancient Greek Drama, Betine Van Zyl Smit (ed.), Wiley Blackwell, 2016.
“Combat Trauma and the Tragic Stage: “Restoration” by Cultural Catharsis” in Caston. V., and Weinecke S. (eds.) Our Ancient Wars, University of Michigan Press, 2016.
Foreword for Aeschylus’ The Seven, translated by Jonathan Tipton, Flood Editions, 2015.
“The Thorniest Problem and the Greatest Opportunity: Directors on Directing the Greek Chorus. Chapter in Choral Mediations in Greek Tragedy, Renauld Gagné, Marianne Hopman (eds.) Cambridge University Press, 2013.
 "The Encyclopedia of Greek Tragedy", Hanna Roismann (ed.). Wiley- Blackwell, 2013
Entries:
Dwellings
Furniture
Masks
Staging of Euripides
Staging of Modern Productions
Stage Set
Stage Vehicles
Statues
Theatre Architecture
Theatrical Space
“Under Athena’s Gaze: The topography of opsis in Aeschylus’ Eumenides” in Performance in Greek and Roman Drama, George W.M. Harrison & Vayos Liapis
(eds.) Brill, 2013.
"A great ox is standing on my tongue" in Out of Silence: Censorship in American Theater, Caridad Svich (ed.), Eye Corner Press, 2012.
"Aeschylus’ Eumenides and Aristophanes’ Clouds" in Readings in Classical Political Thought, P. T. Steinberger (ed.) Hackett Publishing, 2000

References

External links
Aquila Theatre
New York University
New York Times Filmography

Alumni of University College London
Greek–English translators
New York University faculty
Translators to English
1967 births
Living people
People from Melton Mowbray
Princeton University faculty
University of South Carolina faculty